The Charles Koch Institute is a libertarian-oriented public policy research, programming, grant-making, and fellowship-funding organization based in Virginia. Named after Charles Koch, its founder and primary financier, it pursues conservative economic policies and a non-interventionist foreign policy that has been characterized as anti-neoconservative.

History
The Charles Koch Institute was established in 2011 and is housed in a building which it shares with the Charles Koch Foundation. According to Charles Koch, the institute is the beneficiary of a majority of his personal political donations, or those separate from what originates from Koch Industries.

Governance
The institute is governed by a board of directors composed of Charles Koch, Chase Koch, Elizabeth Koch, and Richard Fink. Its president is Brian Hooks.

Programs

Domestic policy
According to the institute, it funds "research that furthers an understanding of how cronyism and corporate welfare affect individual and societal well-being".

In 2015 the organization partnered with the American Civil Liberties Union to study the implications of legislation limiting asset forfeiture in New Mexico. The institute has also developed a Prison Entrepreneurship Program that sponsors business classes and a business plan competition for U.S. prison inmates.

Foreign policy
The institute finances research, forums, and speaking tours regarding U.S. foreign policy, describing its worldview as one that "emphasizes the need to defend our territorial integrity from aggression, promote free trade, peacefully engage with the world, and serve as an exemplar of liberal values".

In 2016 The Intercept described the institute's foreign policy agenda as emblematic of "how foreign policy no longer neatly aligns with party politics", observing one event the organization hosted that appeared more like "a left-wing anti-war rally than a gathering hosted by a longtime right-wing institution". The same year it hosted a conference headlined by Chas Freeman, Stephen Walt, and John Mearsheimer.

Professional education
According to the organization, it underwrites several professional education programs, including the "Koch Associate Program", a fellowship which funds the placement of selected applicants into management positions at partner organizations, which include the Acton Institute, the Regulatory Studies Center at George Washington University, the James Madison Institute, and others.

References

Koch network
Libertarian organizations based in the United States
Libertarian think tanks
Non-interventionism
Organizations established in 2011
Political and economic think tanks in the United States